Kozarno is a small settlement north of Dobrovo in the Municipality of Brda in the Littoral region of Slovenia.

References

External links
Kozarno on Geopedia

Populated places in the Municipality of Brda